Wandlebury Hill Fort, also known as the Wandlebury Ring, is an Iron Age hillfort located on Wandlebury Hill in the Gog Magog Hills, Cambridgeshire, England, to the southeast of Cambridge. Now a country park, it was the most important of three hillforts in the downs.

Geography
Of the three hillforts Cherry Hinton being one of them, Wandlebury was the most important. There are at least two theories regarding why the Wandlebury Hill Fort was built on this site: it may have been chosen because of its tactical grounds, or because it would be the last fortress in a line which controlled the Thames-Stort-Cam Valley route. Wandlebury overlooked the ancient Icknield Way. The meeting point of the hundreds of Thriplow, Chilford, and Flendish is adjacent to Wandlebury.

History
The first hillfort was constructed in about 400 BC, consisting of "a substantial outer ditch and an inner rampart bank of chalk rubble and soil, enclosing a circular area of about 6 ha." A second ditch and bank circuit was added on the inner side of the first rampart in the 1st century BC, and a low counterscarp bank added around the perimeter. The inner ring had a wooden palisading to deter invaders.

Wandlebury was a border settlement. There is evidence that it was occupied by the Romans. The Romans built a road from Worts Causeway to Wandlebury. Two pottery sequences have been found establishing two separate construction phases. It may have been inhabited into the 1st century AD. It was later named Wendlesbiri (meaning, "Waendal's fort") by the Anglo Saxons and used as a Hundred council rendezvous point. Sir Thomas Malory mentions a Wandesborow Castle in Le Morte d'Arthur (1470), possibly referring to the Wandlebury Ring. The site has undergone considerable change since the 17th century. When a house, garden and racing stable was built for King James II within the boundaries of the old fort in 1685, the inner rampart and ditch were levelled. The mansion was later owned by Lord Godolphin and demolished in 1956, but the stable remains. The site is now a country park.
In 1976, a study called “An Integrated Astronomical Complex of Earthworks at Wandlebury and Hatfield Forest from the Third Millenium B.C.” was published. The study, by Christian ‘Tim’ O’Brien and Barbara Joy O’Brien was an attempt to prove that Wandlebury Ring was in fact far older than previously thought and that the hill fort was built on an existing structure. They provided convincing evidence that Wandlebury Ring was an astronomical structure (perhaps a huge calendar) similar to Stonehenge and Avebury stone circle, and was possibly engineered by the same team of mathematicians/astronomers. There is also strong evidence of a loxodrome (a line following the angle of the Earth), marked with monoliths, running from Wandlebury Ring to the earthworks at Hatfield Forest.

Legend and literature

The fort and surrounding hills are shrouded in legends. Gervase of Tilbury said in his Otia Imperialia of 1214:

A knight named Osbert once tested the story and legend has it that he appeared in full armour and defeated the knight who appeared to him but was wounded in the thigh by his opponents' javelin on departing. This is mentioned in Sir Walter Scott's 1808 poem Marmion featuring King Alexander III jousting with a goblin knight. Another poet wrote a poem named Wandlebury Ring, a "nostalgic memory of a happy day in childhood spent at Wandlebury Ring with his family" and in memory of his father.

Gallery

References

Hill forts in Cambridgeshire
Country parks in Cambridgeshire